Ran Geng (born 544BC), also known by his courtesy name Boniu, was one of the most prominent disciples of Confucius. Confucius considered him his third best disciple, after Yan Hui and Min Sun, in terms of moral conduct.

Life
Ran Geng was a native of the State of Lu, and was only seven years younger than Confucius. He was from the same clan as Ran Yong and Ran Qiu, two other prominent disciples of Confucius. When Confucius served as the Minister of Justice of Lu, Ran became the magistrate of Zhongdu. He contracted a vile disease, possibly leprosy, and died young. Confucius lamented his early death with great pain.

Legacy
In Confucian temples, Ran Geng's spirit tablet is placed the fourth among the Twelve Wise Ones, on the west.

Ran Geng's offspring held the title of Wujing Boshi (五经博士; 五經博士; Wǔjīng Bóshì).

References

Citations

Bibliography

544 BC births
Disciples of Confucius
6th-century BC Chinese philosophers
Philosophers from Lu (state)
Year of death unknown
6th-century BC Chinese people